Indelicacy is a 2020 novel by American writer Amina Cain. The novel follows the life of its narrator, Vitória, from shortly before her marriage until shortly after its dissolution.

Writing, composition, and background
The novel took Cain four years to write. The novel is partially set in an unnamed museum and for inspiration, Cain visited the National Gallery in London and the Frick Collection in New York City. The city in which the novel takes place also never receives a name, and Cain has referred to it as "a combination of Chicago, London, and then some imagined place".

Cain had several drafts for the novel, and has referred to earlier versions of the book as "terrible".

Reception

Critical reception
Isabel Berwick, writing in a review for the Financial Times, referred to the novel as "[...] a strange, short, beguiling book." This sentiment was echoed in The New Yorker, which called the book "sparse" and "elliptical".

Berwick grouped Cain's work with that of Jenny Offill and Ottessa Moshfegh, calling their styles "modern flat". 

According to literary review aggregator Book Marks, the novel received mostly "Rave" and "Positive" reviews.

Honors
The book was shortlisted for the 2020 Center for Fiction First Novel Prize.

References

2020 American novels
2020 debut novels
Farrar, Straus and Giroux books
First-person narrative novels
Fictional museums